Bandaliés is a locality located in the municipality of Loporzano, in Huesca province, Aragon, Spain. As of 2020, it has a population of 57.

Geography 
Bandaliés is located 16km east-northeast of Huesca.

References

Populated places in the Province of Huesca